Axis (stylized in all caps as AXIS) is an Indonesian cellular brand licensing service owned by XL Axiata, a subsidiary of the Axiata Group. It provides 2G, 3G and BlackBerry services nationwide and covers the world through 382 international roaming partners in 159 countries.

Acquisition by XL Axiata 
XL Axiata has signed an agreement to acquire Axis Telekom Indonesia, on 26 September 2013.

Merrill Lynch (Singapore) Pte Ltd (Bank of America Merrill Lynch) is acting as financial advisor for this transaction from XL.

References

External link 
 

Axiata
Indonesian companies established in 2008
Mobile phone companies of Indonesia
Telecommunications companies established in 2008
Telecommunications companies of Indonesia
2014 mergers and acquisitions